Task Force 71 (TF-71) has been a naval task force of the United States Navy, active since the 1940s.
The Task Force also used to fulfill the function of Command and Coordination Force, Seventh Fleet. Blue Ridge returned to duty 27 September 2004.

World War II and after 
Task Force 71 was based in Fremantle, Western Australia in 1941–42, operating submarines under Rear Admiral Charles A. Lockwood. He was relieved by Rear Admiral Ralph W. Christie on 7 March 1943. 

Soon after the war, Task Force 71 was designated as the North China Force. Its mission was to support the US occupation of southern Korea. This included executing various show-the-flag operations along the western coast of Korea as well as in the Bohai Sea. These naval demonstrations preceded Operation Campus, the amphibious landing of U.S. Army ground forces at Incheon, Korea, on 8 September 1945.  and  both served with the task force. Subsequently, both returned to the United States in mid-December 1945, ahead of being decommissioned. 

During the first half of 1965, the Seventh Fleet operationally controlled the Vietnam Patrol Force (Task Force 71), the American component of the Operation Market Time effort. The Naval Advisory Group, headquartered in Saigon, served as the liaison between the fleet, Commander U.S. Military Assistance Command, Vietnam, and the South Vietnamese Navy. On 31 July 1965, formal control of the U.S. Operation Market Time force passed from the Seventh Fleet to the Naval Advisory Group, which in turn activated the Coastal Surveillance Force (Task Force 115). The fleet continued to provide logistic and administrative support. The command function was further refined on 1 April 1966 when Naval Forces, Vietnam, was established, relieving the Naval Advisory Group of responsibility for Market Time operations.

Korean DMZ Crisis

Also referred to as a Second Korean War, the Korean DMZ Conflict was a series of low-level armed clashes between North Korean forces and the forces of South Korea and the United States, largely occurring between 1966 and 1969 at the Korean DMZ. The number of incidents along the DMZ jumped from 37 in 1966 to 435 in 1967, with a combined 1967 total of 371 fatalities involving North Korea, South Korea, and United Nations forces while there were no fatalities in 1966 (see chart). Also, during 1967, there were two sabotage attempts to disrupt South Korea railroad operations, the first such attempts since the Korean War. Additionally, in 1967, a South Korean patrol vessel was sunk by North Korea shore batteries over a fishing dispute, with thirty-nine of the 79-man crew killed. Finally, in the most overt incident to date, North Korean commandos from Unit 124 unsuccessfully attempted to assassinate the South Korea president Park Chung-hee at the presidential residence Blue House in Seoul, South Korea, on 21 January 1968.

1968 Pueblo incident

Effective 25 January 1968, in conjunction with Operation Combat Fox, Operation Formation Star was initiated. Taken together, both operations represented a major surge deployment of U.S. naval and air forces into the Sea of Japan region off the eastern coast of North Korea, the largest since the end of the Korean War. Although not directly unrelated to Operation Formation Star, the Republic of Korea Navy also dispatched nineteen ships and two fast patrol boats to sixteen patrol zones around South Korea.> Concurrently with Operation Formation Star and Operation Combat Fox, U.S. President Lyndon B. Johnson signed Executive Order 11392 ordering certain units of the Ready Reserve of the Naval Reserve, Air Force Reserve, and Air National Guard of the United States to active duty. For the U.S. Naval Reserve, this call-up involved six naval air squadrons and two Seabee construction battalions for a total of 1621 naval reservists activated. Taken together, as noted by Secretary of Defense Robert S. McNamara, the purpose of this build-up/call-up was to provide a "measured show of force" in support of the diplomatic effort to resolve the Pueblo crisis peacefully.

Task Force 71, 1968

1969 North Korean EC-121 shootdown

The US responded to the 1969 EC-121 shootdown incident by activating Task Force 71 to protect future flights over international waters neighbouring North Korea. The ships for TF-71 came mostly from Southeast Asia duty. This deployment became one of the largest shows of force in the area since the Korean War.

Following the attack, some, including Representative Mendel Rivers responded to the attack by calling for retaliation against North Korea.  On 16 April, the United States National Security Council considered the following options:
	Show of force using naval and air forces
	Resumption of EC-121 missions with escorts
	"Select military combat actions" such as:
	Destruction of a North Korean aircraft over water
	Selected air strikes against a military target
	Shore bombardment of military targets
	Ground raids across the Demilitarized Zone
	Attack on military targets near the Demilitarized Zone by artillery or missile fire
	Attacks on North Korean naval vessels by U.S. submarines
	Blockade
	Mining/threatening to mine North Korean waters
	Seizure of North Korean assets abroad
In addition to the NSC's ideas, the Joint Chiefs of Staff prepared several plans to bomb the airfield at Sondok and Wonsan.  If all went according to plan, bombers would attack the airfields under cover of night. CINCPAC proposed the positioning of ships, with missiles capable of taking down planes, in the Sea of Japan with orders to destroy North Korean aircraft, impound other North Korean vessels venturing into international waters (fishing boats, etc.), and fire onto the shore (especially near Wonsan).

In the end, no action was taken against the North Koreans in the days following the attack. The new Nixon administration had little to no information about the location and availability of both U.S. and North Korean forces, as the administration had difficulty communicating with those in the Pacific. By the time this information was communicated to the planners, it was too late to react. Both Nixon and Secretary of State Henry Kissinger were ashamed at the outcome of the event, with Kissinger revealing that "our conduct in the EC-121 crisis as weak, indecisive and disorganized." Once it became clear that no action would be taken against the North Koreans, Nixon promised that "they’ll [North Koreans] never get away with it again," and ordered a "resumption of aerial reconnaissance flights."

Task Force 71, 1969

KAL 007 shootdown 
Task Force 71 operated the Search and Rescue/Salvage Operations for Korean Air Lines Flight 007 shot down by the Soviets off Sakhalin Island on 1 September 1983. Cockell was transferred again on 9 September to the destroyer  to assume duties as Officer in Tactical Command (OTC) of the Search and Rescue (SAR) effort. Surface search began immediately and on into the 13-day of September. U.S. underwater operations began on 14 September. With no further hope of finding survivors, on 10 September 1983, the Task Force's mission had been reclassified "Search and Salvage" operation from a "Search and Rescue". On 17 October 1983, Rear Admiral William Cockell was relieved of command of the Task Force and its Search and Salvage mission, and Rear Admiral Walter T. Piotti, Jr., was placed in command.

There were three U.S. search and salvage ships involved—the Coast Guard cutter , the rescue salvage ship , and the Fleet Tug . There were also three Japanese tugs chartered through the U.S. Navy's Far East Salvage Contractor (Selco), these were the Ocean Bull, the Kaiko-Maru 7, and the Kaiko-Maru 3. Aside from these vessels, there were the U.S. naval combatants and logistical support ships. In addition to the above ships, there were numerous Japanese Maritime Safety Agency patrol boats and South Korean vessels involved.

References 

United States Navy task forces